Anthidium helianthinum is a species of bee in the family Megachilidae, the leaf-cutter, carder, or mason bees.

Synonyms
Synonyms for this species include:
Anthidium (Proanthidium) helianthinum Wu, 2004

References

helianthinum
Insects described in 2004